Rahna is a village in the Punjab province of Pakistan. It is located at 32°53'0N 72°42'0E with an altitude of 516 metres (1696 feet).

References

Villages in Punjab, Pakistan